Aleksandar "Tirke" Tirnanić (15 July 1910 – 13 December 1992) was a Serbian football player and manager.

Early life and beginnings
Born in the central Serbian small town of Krnjevo (Velika Plana municipality), Tirnanić was still in infancy when his working-class family moved to the capital Belgrade. He barely remembered his father, a metal factory worker who died in 1914 as part of the Serbian Army World War I effort.

Raised by a single mother, young Tirnanić quickly developed a love for football, which he played endlessly at Bara Venecija pitches on the Sava River's right bank. He got spotted there by coach Radenko Mitrović who brought the talented youngster to SK Jugoslavija youth setup. However, Tirnanić soon moved to arch crosstown rival BSK youth squad where he quickly developed into a notable right-winger. Realizing his potential, he completely immersed himself in football and abandoned school.

Career
He made his first-team senior debut as a 17-year-old, quickly marking himself out as an able and temperamental player, and forming a midfield partnership with Moša Marjanović.

Tirnanić spent most of his senior club career with BSK Beograd for which he appeared in 500 matches. During his career with BSK Tirnanić had great rivals Leo Lemešić (1924-1940) and Ljubo Benčić (1921-1935) who played for Hajduk Split. Additionally, he earned 50 caps and scored 12 goals for the Kingdom of Yugoslavia national team from 1929 to 1940. In 1937 he moved again to SK Jugoslavija where he played until 1938 when he joined BASK. For BASK he played from 1938 to 1939. He later played for two Belgrade based clubs Jedinstvo (1939–1941) and Sloga (1942–1943).

International career
He also appeared in the 1930 FIFA World Cup. The day before he turned 20 he scored a goal, which made him at the time the youngest goalscorer in the World Cup. Later he has been beaten by Manuel Rosas in 1930, Pelé in 1958, Michael Owen in 1998, Dmitri Sychev in 2002 and latest Lionel Messi in 2006, which makes him the sixth youngest goalscorer in the FIFA World Cup. Later, he coached the Yugoslav team in two more World Cups, 1954 and 1958, the football tournaments at the Summer Olympics, 1948, 1952 and 1960 when Yugoslavia won gold medal, also appearing in the 1960 European Nations' Cup when Yugoslavia scored second place.

During the Balkan Cup, held in 1935 in Athens, Greece, Tirnanić and Tomašević were the top goalscorers of the tournament with 3 goals each. Thanks to these contributions Yugoslavia won the Balkan Cup in that edition, leaving behind Greece, Romania, and Bulgaria.

In the films Montevideo, God Bless You! (2010) and See You in Montevideo (2014), Tirnanić was portrayed by actor Miloš Biković.

International goals
Yugoslavia's goal tally first

References

External links
 Profile at reprezentacija.rs 

1910 births
1992 deaths
People from Velika Plana
Serbian footballers
Serbian football managers
Yugoslav football managers
OFK Beograd players
FK BASK players
SK Jedinstvo Beograd players
Yugoslav First League players
1930 FIFA World Cup players
1954 FIFA World Cup managers
1958 FIFA World Cup managers
1960 European Nations' Cup managers
Yugoslav footballers
Yugoslavia international footballers
Association football wingers